Mahmoud Abdeen (born 23 December 1987) is a Jordanian professional basketball player for the Jordanian national basketball team and Al-Ahli of the Jordanian Premier Basketball League. He is the MVP of the 2019-20 season, and considered one of the all-star five players of the league.

Professional career
Abdeen played the 2015–16 season at Filippino side San Miguel Beermen, where he averaged 3.67 points, 1.67 rebounds and 2.33 assists. He played the 2017-18 season at Al-Kahraba team in the Iraqi Basketball League. He moved Al-Wehdat SC in the 2018–19 season, where he earned the MVP award at that time. Abdeen re-signed with the team on 28 September 2021.

National team career
Mahmoud Abdeen represented the Jordan national basketball team  at the 2013 FIBA Asia Championship where he averaged 6.6 points, 1.7 rebounds and 1.7 assists. He participated at the 2015 FIBA Asia Championship where he averaged 10 points, 2.3 rebounds and 2.4 assists. He also played at the 2017 FIBA Asia Championship where he averaged 14.3 points, 2.3 rebounds and 5.9 assists. He also played at the 2019 FIBA Basketball World Cup in China, where he averaged 5.4 point, 1.3 rebound and 1.8 assists.

References

1987 births
Living people
2019 FIBA Basketball World Cup players
Asian Games competitors for Jordan
Basketball players at the 2010 Asian Games
Basketball players at the 2014 Asian Games
Jordanian expatriate basketball people in Iraq
Jordanian expatriate basketball people in the Philippines
Jordanian men's basketball players
Philippine Basketball Association imports
San Miguel Beermen players
Sportspeople from Amman